Rick O'Dell (born October 26, 1948 in Victoria, British Columbia) is a former NASCAR driver. He made one Winston Cup start in the 1981 Warner W. Hodgdon 400 at Riverside International Raceway where he finished sixteenth.

He also made 20 starts in the Winston West series from 1978 to 1981.

See also
List of Canadians in NASCAR

External links 
Rick O'Dell at Racing-Reference

1948 births
Living people
Racing drivers from British Columbia
NASCAR drivers
Sportspeople from Victoria, British Columbia
Canadian racing drivers